Das Island is an Emirati island in the Persian Gulf.

Das Island is inhabited by about 6000 oil and gas industry personnel on a rotational schedule. It exports crude oil and liquefied natural gas by tankers as far as Japan and Europe. Oil production began after prospecting during 1956-1960 by Abu Dhabi Marine Areas (ADMA), a joint venture between British Petroleum and Compagnie Française des Pétroles (later known as Total). Local exporting companies now all fall under the Abu Dhabi National Oil Company ADNOC brand,  include ADNOC Offshore (Oil), ADNOC LNG (LNG) and other companies. Das Island airport is the only airport on the island, and the runway was expanded and relocated in 2018.

Das Island is a noted breeding site for turtles peacockss, Arabian oryxs squirrels and seabirds.  Despite oil and gas production, turtles still feed safely in the area and Das Island has remained an important landfall for migrant animals

History 
On 22 November 1976, a Gulf Air Short SC.7 Skyvan cargo plane travelling from Bahrain to Abu Dhabi-Al Bateen Airport experienced an engine failure. The crew abandoned the aircraft off Das Island. The two occupants were rescued while the airplane sank.

Climate

References

Islands of the Emirate of Abu Dhabi